George Terence Evelyn Kealey (born 16 February 1952) is a British biochemist who was Vice-Chancellor of the University of Buckingham, a private university in Britain. He was appointed Professor of Clinical Biochemistry in 2011. Prior to his tenure at Buckingham, Kealey lectured in clinical biochemistry at the University of Cambridge. He is well known for his outspoken opposition to public funding of science.

Education
Kealey was educated at Charterhouse School, completed his degrees of Bachelor of Medicine, Bachelor of Surgery and Bachelor of Science in biochemistry at St Bartholomew's Hospital, then gained a Doctor of Philosophy degree from Balliol College, Oxford, in 1982 for a thesis on actomyosin in rat parotid and eccrine sweat glands.

Publications
Kealey occasionally writes pieces for the Daily Telegraph and is the author of several books on the economics of science.  He has written about how Margaret Thatcher transformed Britain's universities and schools as Secretary of State for Education and Science from 1970 to 1974, and has suggested that a debate with him in 1985 helped to shape her views on the Nobel Prize and the role of the state in sponsoring science. He cites the economic study of the business of science by Angus Maddison, as well as a survey entitled The Sources of Economic Growth in OECD Countries (2003), which found that between 1971 and 1998 only privately funded research had stimulated economic growth in the world's 21 leading industrialised countries. However, this theory has been challenged by a study which agrees with Kealey's criticism of the linear model but tries to support the value of state funding by the production of externalities.

Advocacy of privatisation of higher education
In February 2010, Kealey proposed the establishment of a new independent university, modelled on American liberal arts colleges, which would concentrate on undergraduate teaching rather than research. It was to be based at the disused Wye College in Kent, owned by Imperial College. The plan was supported by the Headmasters' and Headmistresses' Conference (HMC), whose 243 members include independent schools such as Eton College, Winchester College and St Paul's School, London. Kealey believed that complaints about impersonal teaching and oversized classes at many traditional universities mean there would be strong demand for higher education with staff-student ratios similar to that provided by independent secondary schools.

References

Living people
Vice-Chancellors by university in England
1952 births
Academics of the University of Buckingham
Alumni of Balliol College, Oxford
People educated at Charterhouse School
British biochemists